Club Deportivo Walter Ormeño (sometimes referred as Walter Ormeño de Cañete) is a Peruvian football club, playing in the city of Cañete, Lima, Peru.

History
The Club Deportivo Walter Ormeño was founded on October 10, 1950. It was named Club Walter Ormeño, in honor of Walter Ormeño, the goalkeeper from Universitario de Deportes, because most of the founders were supporters of the team. It originally played in the San Vicente District League in the beginning but it move to the Imperial District League where it would see much of its early success. The team would win the 1970 Lima Department League.

In 1974, The Peruvian Football Federation would promote all eight regional Copa Peru champions to the 1974 Torneo Descentralizado. That year would be the first and last year in which the club would play in the highest level of Peruvian football. It would be relegated on a new relegation system which eliminated the worst team in the league, the worst from the Metropolitan Lima area team, and the worst two teams from the Peruvian departments that had more than two teams in the league. This meant that Walter Ormeño, Piérola, and Juan Aurich would play an extra group stage to decide who would stay in the league where the team did not succeed. Years later it would be invited to play in the Peruvian Segunda Division where it would be runner-up behind Hijos de Yurimaguas in 1990 only to be relegated in 1991. In 2013, after a reaching the round of 16 of the 2012 Copa Peru it was invited to play the Peruvian Segunda Division once more.

Notable players
 Víctor Calatayud
 Luis Cruzado
 Daniel Reyes
 Martín Rodríguez Custodio

Honours

National
Peruvian Segunda División:
Runner-up (2): 1973, 1990

Regional
Región IV:
Winners (2): 1974, 2012

Liga Departamental de Lima:
Winners (1): 1969
Runner-up (5): 1966, 1968, 1970, 1973, 2012

Liga Provincial de Cañete:
Winners (5): 1970, 2012, 2018, 2019, 2022

Liga Distrital de Imperial:
Winners (17): 1957, 1958, 1959, 1966, 1967, 1968, 1969, 1970, 1971, 1972, 1973, 2012, 2016, 2017, 2018, 2019, 2022
Runner-up (4): 1960, 1961, 1962, 1963

See also
List of football clubs in Peru
Peruvian football league system

External links
 Sin paradero: Por el resurgimiento cañetano

 
Football clubs in Peru
Association football clubs established in 1950